Daniël Roos (born 9 August 1959) is a French chess player who holds the FIDE title of International Master (IM, 1982). He was an individual gold medalist at the 25th Chess Olympiad in 1982.

Biography
Roos comes from a French chess family. His father Michel Roos (1932–2002) won the French Chess Championship in 1964; this success was repeated by his brother Louis in 1977. His mother Jacqueline Roos (died 2016) was International Correspondence Chess Grandmaster (2000), his sister Céline (1953–2021) was a Woman International Master (WIM), his brothers Jean-Luc (born 1955) and Louis (born 1957) are International Masters (IM).

In 2009, in Salzburg, he shared 2nd - 5th place in International Chess Tournament 24. Schwarzacher Open. In 2011, in Baden-Baden he ranked 3rd in International Chess Tournament Sommer-Open.

Roos played for France in the Chess Olympiads:
 In 1980, at second reserve board in the 24th Chess Olympiad in La Valletta (+1, =5, -1),
 In 1982, at first reserve board in the 25th Chess Olympiad in Lucerne (+8, =2, -1) and won individual gold medal.

He played for France in the World Youth U26 Team Chess Championship:
 In 1981, at first board in the 3rd World Youth U26 Team Chess Championship in Graz (+2, =7, -2),
 In 1983, at first board in the 4th World Youth U26 Team Chess Championship in Chicago (+3, =1, -4).

Also, Roos seven times played for France in the Chess Mitropa Cup (1977-1979, 1984-1988) and in team competition won silver (1987) and bronze (1977) medals, but in individual competition won gold (1977) medal.

In 1982, he was awarded the FIDE International Master (IM) title.

References

External links

 
 
 

1959 births
Living people
French chess players
Chess International Masters
Chess Olympiad competitors